Aamulehti (Finnish for "morning newspaper") is a Finnish-language daily newspaper published in Tampere, Finland.

History and profile
Aamulehti was founded in 1881 to "improve the position of the Finnish people and the Finnish language" during Russia's rule over Finland. The founders were nationalistic Finns in Tampere.

During the Cold War period Aamulehti was among the Finnish newspapers which were accused by the Soviet Union of being the instrument of US propaganda, and the Soviet Embassy in Helsinki frequently protested the editors of the paper.

In the 1980s, Aamulehti Corporation acquired the paper Uusi Suomi, which they shut down in 1991. Aamulehti was published in broadsheet format until April 2014 when the paper switched to tabloid format. Matti Apunen was the editor-in-chief of the paper until 2010. The paper is based in Tampere and serves the Pirkanmaa region.

Until 1992 the paper aligned itself with the National Coalition Party, but it no longer has an official connection to any political party.

Aamulehti Corporation was the owner of Aamulehti until 2003 when the paper was acquired by Alma Media, a large media corporation in Finland, for a reported 460 million euros. In 2020, the Sanoma corporation acquired Alma Media, and thus, also Aamulehti.

Since 2006 Aamulehti has published four weekly supplements — Moro (meaning "Hi", in the dialect of the Tampere region, and devoted to the culture of Tampere), on Thursdays; the entertainment-centred Valo ("Light"), published on Fridays; Asiat ("Matters"), on Sundays; and Ihmiset ("People"), also on Sundays. The paper covers journalism innovation at least once a month.

Circulation

Peaking in 2008, Aamulehti grew steadily, regularly reporting the third-highest newspaper circulation numbers in Finland. The circulation was 135,194 copies in 1993, reaching 135,478 copies in 2001. By 2004 the paper had an average daily circulation of 136,028 copies per day and 140,802 copies on Sundays, with an estimated readership of 329,000. Aamulehti'''s circulation was 136,743 copies in 2005; 138,258 copies (2006); 139,165 copies (2007) — reaching a high-water mark of 139,130 copies in 2008, then declining to 135,293 copies in 2009; 131,539 copies (2010); 130,081 copies (2011); and 114,231 copies in 2013.

By 2014 Aamulehti had Finland's second-largest circulation and had the fifth-largest estimated readership. In 2010, with 262,947 weekly visitors, the online version of Aamulehti was the twenty-third most visited website in Finland.

 Editors 
 F. V. Jalander 1881–1884
 Kaarlo Viljakainen 1884–1905
 Aukusti Alhovuori 1905–1912
 Eetu A. Alha 1913–1926
 Jaakko Tuomikoski 1931–1956
 Jaakko Hakala 1956–1964
 Raino Vehmas 1971–1979
 Pertti Pesonen 1979–1990
 Raimo Seppälä 1991–1998
 Matti Apunen 1998, 2000–2010
 Jouko Jokinen 2010–present

See also
 Tamperelainen''

References

External links
 Aamulehti
 

1881 establishments in Finland
Finnish news websites
Finnish-language newspapers
Mass media in Tampere
Daily newspapers published in Finland
Publications established in 1881